Andreas Beck and Martin Fischer were the defending champions, but decided not to compete.

Radu Albot and Artem Sitak won the title, defeating Andrea Arnaboldi and Flavio Cipolla in the final, 4–6, 6–2, [11–9].

Seeds

Draw

Draw

References
 Main Draw

Rome Open - Doubles
2014 Doubles
Roma